The 1902 North-West Territories general election, occurred on 21 May 1902 and was the fifth general election in the history of the North-West Territories, Canada. It was held to elect 35 Members of the Legislative Assembly of the North-West Territories.

Frederick W. A. G. Haultain and the Liberal-Conservatives continued with government. Donald H. McDonald was thrust into being the Liberal leader just days before the vote, with the surprise decision by Robert Brett to drop out of the race.

Three years after the 1902 election, the provinces of Alberta and Saskatchewan were carved out of North-West Territories in 1905, and they took most of the voting population with them. The 1902 election was the  last election held in the NWT until 1951, and it elected the last assembly in the Northwest Territories (NWT) to use political parties. After 1905, the NWT government reverted to an appointed consensus model of government. Since 1951, the government of NWT has been of the elected consensus model of government.

Candidates in this election were not nominated by the party in a contested nomination as with modern elections, but rather proclaimed their support for the governing party or opposition party, or Independent. During the election race some candidates shifted their alignment. The result was a confusing mess, and the bulk of candidates proclaimed support for the already governing Liberal-Conservative party, leaving the Liberals without candidates in many districts. Lethbridge ended up being contested by two government supporting candidates.

1902 would also see the largest number of MLAs elected to the North-West Territories Legislature in the territories' history.

Election summary

Note:
Sources are conflicted about the affiliation of some candidates, vote counts and total number of candidates are accurate, standings and votes by party may change upon further research.

Members of the Legislative Assembly elected
For complete electoral history, see individual districts

Note:
* Sources are conflicted on Richard Bennett as to whether he was a Liberal or Independent

See also
1905 Alberta general election
1905 Saskatchewan general election
List of Northwest Territories general elections
2nd Council of the Northwest Territories

Further reading
 

1902 elections in Canada
1902 in the Northwest Territories
Elections in the Northwest Territories
May 1902 events